Eldred Township is a township in Monroe County, Pennsylvania, United States. The population was 2,594 at the 2020 census.

Geography
It is drained by the Aquashicola Creek and the Buckwha Creek westward into the Lehigh River. Blue Mountain forms its natural southern boundary. Its villages include Fiddletown, Kunkletown, and Smith Gap.

Neighboring municipalities
Polk Township (north)
Chestnuthill Township (tangent to the northeast)
Ross Township (east)
Moore Township, Northampton County (south)
Lower Towamensing Township, Carbon County (west)
Towamensing Township, Carbon County (west)

Demographics

As of the census of 2000, there were 2,665 people, 941 households, and 718 families residing in the township.  The population density was 109.6 people per square mile (42.3/km2).  There were 1,069 housing units at an average density of 44.0/sq mi (17.0/km2).  The racial makeup of the township was 97.71% White, 0.53% African American, 0.30% Native American, 0.19% Asian, 0.45% from other races, and 0.83% from two or more races. Hispanic or Latino of any race were 1.39% of the population.

There were 941 households, out of which 33.6% had children under the age of 18 living with them, 63.1% were married couples living together, 7.4% had a female householder with no husband present, and 23.6% were non-families. 17.7% of all households were made up of individuals, and 7.2% had someone living alone who was 65 years of age or older.  The average household size was 2.72 and the average family size was 3.08.

In the township the population was spread out, with 24.8% under the age of 18, 7.0% from 18 to 24, 28.0% from 25 to 44, 25.7% from 45 to 64, and 14.6% who were 65 years of age or older.  The median age was 39 years. For every 100 females, there were 99.5 males.  For every 100 females age 18 and over, there were 99.5 males.

The median income for a household in the township was $42,500, and the median income for a family was $46,875. Males had a median income of $32,500 versus $20,811 for females. The per capita income for the township was $18,079.  About 7.1% of families and 9.0% of the population were below the poverty line, including 13.5% of those under age 18 and 6.5% of those age 65 or over.

Climate

According to the Trewartha climate classification system, Eldred Township has a Temperate Continental climate (Dc) with warm summers (b), cold winters (o) and year-around precipitation (Dcbo). Dcbo climates are characterized by at least one month having an average mean temperature ≤ , four to seven months with an average mean temperature ≥ , all months with an average mean temperature <  and no significant precipitation difference between seasons. Although most summer days are slightly humid in Eldred Township, episodes of heat and high humidity can occur, with heat index values > . July is the peak month for thunderstorm activity, which correlates with the average warmest month of the year. The average wettest month is September, which correlates with tropical storm remnants during the peak of the Atlantic hurricane season. Since 1981, the wettest calendar day has been 5.64 inches (143 mm), on September 30, 2010. Episodes of extreme cold and wind can occur with wind chill values < . The average snowiest month is January, which correlates with the average coldest month of the year. Ice storms and large snowstorms depositing ≥ 12 inches (30 cm) of snow occur once every couple of years, particularly during nor’easters from December through March.

Transportation

No numbered highways pass through Eldred Township. The township's main thoroughfares include Chestnut Ridge Drive, Fiddletown Road, Kunkletown Road, Molasses Valley Road, Silver Spring Boulevard, Smith Gap Road and Weir Valley Road.

Ecology

According to the A. W. Kuchler U.S. potential natural vegetation types, Eldred Township would have a dominant vegetation type of Appalachian Oak (104) with a dominant vegetation form of Eastern Hardwood Forest (25). The peak spring bloom typically occurs in late-April and peak fall color usually occurs in mid-October.

References

Populated places established in 1742
Townships in Monroe County, Pennsylvania
Townships in Pennsylvania
1742 establishments in Pennsylvania